Otoniel "Tony" Navarrete (born October 14, 1986) is an American politician who served as the state senator for Arizona's 30th legislative district from 2019 to 2021. A member of the Democratic Party, he previously served one term as a state representative for Arizona's 30th legislative district from 2017 to 2019. He resigned from the state senate on August 10, 2021, after being charged with multiple counts of sexual conduct with underaged children.

Career
Navarrete was a community organizer with Promise Arizona, a pro-immigration advocacy group which helped Hispanics and Latinos register to vote at taco trucks after Marco Gutierrez's "taco trucks on every corner" remark. During his time in office, Navarrete was one of four openly LGBT members of the Arizona State Legislature, alongside Robert Meza, Daniel Hernández, and Cesar Chavez, and was a founding member of the legislature's LGBT caucus.

Child sex abuse charges
On August 5, 2021, Navarrete was arrested in Phoenix on multiple charges of sexual conduct with a minor in 2019, including one count of molestation of a minor involving two boys aged 16 and 13. The two victims worked with the FBI to secure verbal testimony from Navarrete admitting to and apologizing for the sexual acts.  The two boys, per the police report, were his nephews.  Navarette abused one boy at night for several years per recorded conversations overhead by police.  He was released on a $50,000 secured bond. The serious nature of the charges resulted in bipartisan calls for his resignation. Navarette resigned on August 10, 2021.

Elections
In 2016, Navarrete and Ray Martinez defeated incumbent Jonathan Larkin in the Democratic primary and went on to defeat Republican Gary Cox the general election.

References

External links
 Biography at Ballotpedia

21st-century American politicians
Democratic Party Arizona state senators
Arizona politicians convicted of crimes
Hispanic and Latino American state legislators in Arizona
LGBT Hispanic and Latino American people
LGBT state legislators in Arizona
Living people
Democratic Party members of the Arizona House of Representatives
American politicians convicted of sex offences
Year of birth missing (living people)
1986 births